The 1976 Soviet Cup Final was a football match that took place at the Lenin's Central Stadium, Moscow on 3 September 1976. The match was the 35th soviet cup final and was contested between Dinamo Tbilisi and Ararat Yerevan. Ararat were current cup holders winning it in 1975. Dinamo defeated the opponent 3–0 and won the cup for the first time.

Road to Final

Previous encounters 

Previously these two teams met each other three times in the competition. Dinamo knocked–out opponents two times, while Ararat have done it once. The club from Tbilisi progressed in 1937, winning the game 4–1 and in 1971 competition 0–0, 2–1, while the club from Yerevan eliminated the opponent in 1975 winning the game 3–1.

Match details

See also
 1976 Soviet Top League

References

External links
 The competition calendar 1
 The competition calendar 2

Soviet Cup finals
1976 in Soviet football
FC Ararat Yerevan
FC Dinamo Tbilisi matches
September 1976 sports events in Europe
1976 in Moscow